The Franklin Inn was built by Cornelius Van Liew in 1752.  Located at 2371 Amwell Road (Route 514), East Millstone, New Jersey.  Originally it was the Van Liew farmhouse, it has also been known as Annie Van Liew's house and, after being remodeled into a tavern and inn, the Franklin House Hotel. It was added to the National Register of Historic Places as a contributing property of the East Millstone Historic District on March 17, 1983.

History
Cornelius Van Liew (1734-1777) married Antje Bowman aka Anne Bowman in 1757, and they lived in the house. Their children were: Frederick Van Liew (1758-?); Cornelius Van Liew (1762-?); Antje "Anne" Van Liew (1764-?); Marya "Mary" van Liew (1766-?); Deneys van Liew (1767-?); Johanis "John" Van Liew (1770-?); and Helena Van Liew (1772-?)

In June 1777, during the Revolutionary War, Charles Cornwallis commandeered  the house and used it as his headquarters for five days. Several thousand British troops were encamped nearby in what is now Colonial Park Arboretum and Gardens. William Howe, 5th Viscount Howe and his troops were in New Brunswick, New Jersey and Middlebush, New Jersey.  During the war, American Revolutionary generals used the house to hold meetings.

The house and property stayed with the Van Liew family until 1822, when it was sold to John Wyckoff. Wyckoff rented the property, and it was used as a tavern starting in 1829. The Delaware and Raritan Canal nearby was opened in 1834.

The tavern was closed in 1916 with prohibition. The building was operated as a used book store by the Meadows Foundation until 2012 when it was flooded by Hurricane Sandy and closed.

Gallery

References

External links
 
Franklin Inn on the Meadows Foundation web site
Franklin Township Public Library's Photo Archive of the Franklin Inn

Franklin Township, Somerset County, New Jersey
Meadows Foundation (New Jersey)
Houses completed in 1752
Houses in Somerset County, New Jersey
Historic American Buildings Survey in New Jersey
National Register of Historic Places in Somerset County, New Jersey
Historic district contributing properties in New Jersey